Hinduism is the religion of about 23.3% of the population of Guyana in 2020. Guyana has the highest percentage of Hindus in the Western Hemisphere.

History 
After the 1833 Slavery Abolition Act in the British Empire, the need for labour led to the recruitment of Indians in Guyana and other British West Indian territories. Upon arrival, the new workers had to adapt to the extreme tropical conditions, along with their new contracts and working conditions. Between 1835 and 1918, 341,600 indentured laborers were imported into British Guyana from India.

From 1852, Christian missionaries attempted to convert East Indians during the indenture period, but this met with little success. When Christian missionaries started proselytizing, Brahmins started administering spiritual rites to all Hindus regardless of caste. This led to the breakdown of the caste system there.

In the late 1940s, reform movements caught the attention of many Guyanese Hindus. In 1910, Arya Samaj arrived in Guyana. Samaj's doctrine rejects the idea of caste and the exclusive role of Brahmins as religious leaders. The movement preaches monotheism and opposition to the use of images in worship as well as many traditional Hindu rituals. After the 1930s, Hindu conversions to Christianity slowed because the status of Hinduism improved and discrimination against Hindus diminished.

Demographics
Hinduism has been slowly decreasing for many decades. In 1991, 35.0% of the Guyanese population adhered to Hinduism, decreasing to 28.4% in 2002, 24.8% in 2012

Geographical distribution of Hindus

Tamil (Madrasi) Hindus forms the majority in East Berbice-Corentyne region.

Although 39.8% of the Guyana's population is East Indian, only 24.8% are Hindus. The remainder is mostly Muslim (6.8%) or Christian.

Public Holidays
Holi-Phagwah and Deepavali are National Holidays in Guyana.

Temples

Tain Hindu Mandir
Central Vaidik Mandir
Sita Ram Toolsie Vade Ganesh Mandir
Shree Maha Kali Devi Temple
Edinburgh Shree Krishna Mandir
Hampton Court Mandir
ISKCON New Kulinagram
D'Edward Vighneshwar Mandir

See also

Hinduism in Belize
Hinduism in French Guiana
Hinduism in South America
Hinduism in Suriname
Hinduism in Trinidad and Tobago
Hindu eschatology

References

External links 

 
Religion in Guyana